The 1922 Springfield Red and White football team was an American football team that represented Springfield College as an independent during the 1922 college football season. Led by first-year head coach Edward J. Hickox, Springfield compiled a record of 6–2. Frank G. Civiletto was the team's captain. Springfield played their season opener against  at the Eastern States Exposition oval and the remainder of their home games at Pratt Field in Springfield, Massachusetts.

Schedule

References

Springfield
Springfield Pride football seasons
Springfield Red and White football